Uranotaenia (Uranotaenia) campestris is a species of mosquito belonging to the genus Uranotaenia. It is found in Thailand, Sri Lanka, Bangladesh, Cambodia, India, Indonesia, Malaysia, Nepal, Timor, and Vietnam.

References

External links
Survey of new mosquito species of Meghalaya, India

campestris
Insects described in 1908